Sir Capel Molyneux, 3rd Baronet PC (Ire) (1717 – August 1797) was an Irish politician.

Early life
Capel was the son of Sir Thomas Molyneux, 1st Baronet and his second  wife Catherine Howard, daughter of Professor Ralph Howard. In 1738 he succeeded his brother Daniel to the title of Baronet and to all the family estates except Castle Dillon, which he did not inherit until 1759, when the former wife of his late first cousin died.

Capel graduated with a Bachelor of Arts in 1737 and received an honorary LLD in 1768.

Career
He was appointed High Sheriff of Armagh in 1744 and sat for Clogher in the Irish House of Commons from 1761 to 1768. Subsequently, he represented Dublin University to 1776 and then again for Clogher to 1783. He was invested to the Privy Council of Ireland in 1776.

Marriages and children
His first marriage was in 1747 to Elizabeth East, sister of Sir William East, 1st Baronet, they had two sons and two daughters:

 Sir Capel Molyneux, 4th Baronet (1750–1832), who married Margaret O'Donnell, daughter of Sir Neal O'Donnell, 1st Baronet, in 1785.
 George William Molyneux (1751–1806), who served as MP for Granard.
 Anne Molyneux, who married Sir Anthony Brabazon, 1st Baronet.
 Harriet Molyneux (d. 1866), who married Gen. William John Arabin.

In 1757 his first wife died and he married Elizabeth Adlercron, a daughter of Elizabeth Arabin and Lt. Gen. John Adlercron, formerly Commander-in-Chief, India, on 17 August 1766. By her he had two sons:

 Sir Thomas Molyneux, 5th Baronet (1766–1841), who married Elizabeth Perrin, daughter of Thomas Perrin, in 1800.
 John Molyneux (1769–1832) of the Royal Navy who married Ella Young, daughter of John Young, in 1800.

Sir Capel died in August 1797 and was succeeded in the baronetcy by his eldest son, Capel.

Descendants
Through his daughter Anne, he was a grandfather of Sir William Brabazon, 2nd Baronet, and Sarah Brabazon (who married Henry Roper-Curzon, 14th Baron Teynham). Through his daughter Harriet, he was a grandfather of William St Julien Arabin, who served as the Judge-Advocate-General of the Army.

References

External links
Craigavon Historical Society

1717 births
1797 deaths
Baronets in the Baronetage of Ireland
High Sheriffs of Armagh
Irish MPs 1761–1768
Irish MPs 1769–1776
Irish MPs 1776–1783
Members of the Privy Council of Ireland
Members of the Parliament of Ireland (pre-1801) for County Tyrone constituencies
Members of the Parliament of Ireland (pre-1801) for Dublin University